Amiruddin Shah (born 13 June) is The First Indian Classical Male Ballet Dancer and was the CEO of a British social media company TAD. Which Shah, created while was a student at The Royal Ballet School. Shah has the distinction of being the first native-born dancer from India to ever receive a scholarship to the prestigious school of The Royal Ballet and to dance professionally with an American ballet company, the Miami City Ballet. While in Miami he worked with superstar ballet choreographer Alexei Ratmansky.

Shah has broken barriers, both cultural and artistic, and this is not an overstatement. 

The movie Yeh Ballet, a Netflix original movie released in February 2020, is based on Shah's early life story and the early life of his elder brother Nizamuddin Shah.

References
 https://www.braingainmag.com/how-amiruddin-shah-pirouetted-his-way-from-mumbais-slums-to-the-royal-ballet-school.htm
 https://www.facebook.com/royal.ballet.school/posts/today-we-announce-that-the-2017-20-recipient-of-the-rbs-nadia-nerina-scholarship/2130197543672413/
 https://m.cnnindonesia.com/hiburan/20170707052530-241-226257/ujung-kaki-anak-tukang-las-melangkah-ke-new-york
 https://www.royalballetschool.org.uk/2017/10/17/nadia-nerina-scholar-announced/
 https://www.theweek.in/theweek/leisure/2020/02/28/stage-meets-screen.html
 https://scroll.in/reel/894084/sooni-taraporevala-to-make-ballet-boys-about-mumbais-homegrown-ballet-dancers
 https://www.globalindian.com/youth/story/global-indian-exclusive/an-indian-ballet-star-in-the-miami-city-ballet-amiruddin-shah-pirouettes-to-glory/
 https://www.dancemagazine.com/indian-ballet-dancer/
 https://www.instagram.com/amiruddinshah_official/?hl=en
 https://www.thebetterindia.com/283490/yeh-ballet-netflix-real-life-true-story-amiruddin-shah-manish-chauhan-mumbai/

1999 births
Living people
Ballet dancers
Indian dancers